Karl Schäfer (17 May 1909 – 23 April 1976) was an Austrian figure skater and swimmer. In figure skating, he became a two-time Olympic champion at the 1932 Winter Olympics and the 1936 Winter Olympics. He was also a seven-time World champion (1930–1936) and eight-time European champion (1929–1936). As a swimmer, he competed at the 1928 Summer Olympics in the 200 metre breaststroke.

Early life and skating career 
Karl Schäfer was born not far from the artificial ice rink of Eduard Engelmann Jr. in Vienna-Hernals. Figure skating coach Rudolf Kutzer first recognized Schäfer's talent when he was 11 years old.

Schäfer won ten consecutive medals at the World Championships and European Championships, including seven and eight consecutive gold medals respectively, an all-time high for consecutive titles in both competitions (Sweden's Ulrich Salchow holds the record for all-time non-consecutive titles, ten World and nine European titles). He competed at the 1928 Winter Olympics and placed 4th. He won back-to-back Olympic titles in men's singles at the 1932 Winter Olympics and the 1936 Winter Olympics.

Schäfer retired from competitive skating in 1936. He moved for a couple of years to the United States, where he worked as a coach. In 1938, he opened a sport store in Vienna. In 1940, he and Herta Wächter (also a figure skating coach) founded the "Karl-Schäfer-Eisrevue" (Karl Schäfer Ice Revue). In 1943, Schäfer became an actor and was the star of the movie The White Dream, which was produced on Engelmann's ice rink in Vienna-Hernals.

After World War II, Schäfer participated in rebuilding the Engelmann's ice rink, and from 1946 on he coached young skaters there. He moved again to the U.S. in 1956 and worked there as a figure skating coach until 1962. In 1962, he returned as a coach to Vienna-Hernals and lived and worked there until he died.

The Karl Schäfer Memorial was a figure skating competition named after him that was held in Vienna from 1974 to 2008.

Swimming career 
Schäfer was the Austrian breaststroke champion several times. He competed in the 1928 Summer Olympics and was eliminated in the semi-finals of the 200 metre breaststroke event.

Personal life 
Schäfer played the violin very well. He married Christine Engelmann, the youngest daughter of Eduard Engelmann Jr. He was the brother-in-law of Helene Engelmann.

Results

Figure skating

References

Navigation

1909 births
1976 deaths
Figure skaters from Vienna
Austrian male single skaters
Austrian male breaststroke swimmers
Olympic figure skaters of Austria
Olympic swimmers of Austria
Swimmers at the 1928 Summer Olympics
Figure skaters at the 1928 Winter Olympics
Figure skaters at the 1932 Winter Olympics
Figure skaters at the 1936 Winter Olympics
Olympic gold medalists for Austria
People from Hernals
Olympic medalists in figure skating
World Figure Skating Championships medalists
European Figure Skating Championships medalists
Medalists at the 1932 Winter Olympics
Medalists at the 1936 Winter Olympics